Higglytown Heroes is an American CGI-animated children's television series produced by Wild Brain that aired on the Playhouse Disney block on Disney Channel in the United States. The show's characters are shaped like Russian nesting dolls. In the show, children Eubie, Wayne, Twinkle, Kip and their best friend, Fran the Squirrel, learn about all of the important jobs that people do in Higglytown. 65 episodes were produced.

The theme song of the show, Here in Higglytown, is performed by They Might Be Giants, which was also released on their second children's album Here Come the ABCs. After its series finale originally aired on January 7, 2008, reruns aired on Playhouse Disney until March 29, 2009. Disney Junior (the channel) then aired it in reruns from March 23, 2012 until May 16, 2014. The show was added to Disney+ in April 2021. The Higglytown Heroes TV series was made using Alias Maya which was used to design models and textures for the Higglytown Heroes characters, and Photoshop which was used to create the 2D backgrounds and 2D props. The lyrics to the first "Hero" song were written by Kent Redeker, one of the show's executive producers. The song was composed and produced by Mark Harrison, the show's senior songwriter.

Hero Song
Each episode contains two songs. An initial "dilemma" song which sets up the "problem" which needs to be solved followed by the "I'm a Higglytown Hero" song which introduces the hero who solves the problem, some of the heroes would later appear in later episodes.

While every hero song has the same basic melody as the initial hero song, it was performed and produced each song with different lyrics and instrumentation to fit the episode's specific hero. It starts with the hero introducing themselves, explaining their duties, the children bringing up nonsensical rhyming hypothetical situations and that their duties would cover these situations as well, that they work hard to serve and that they should work hard to be a hero "just like you" [sic].

Brad Mossman, the other principal songwriter, composed lyrics and music for a number of dilemma songs in many episodes as well.

This show was re-dubbed in the UK sometime between 2005 and 2010, which aired in the UK on Playhouse Disney on April 11, 2005. In the UK dub, Fran is voiced by veteran actress Sue Johnston, Eubie is voiced by Jonathan Bee and Joe Cooper, Wayne is voiced by Africa Nile, Twinkle is voiced by Amira McCarthy, and Kip was voiced by Matthew Thomas Davies, this also included most of the character cast in the show who ware voiced by the majority of the actors in the UK. Pizza Guy is called Pizza Man instead, causing minor lip-sync issues, most of which would probably not be noticed by the show's target audience.

Characters
Eubie (voiced by Taylor Masamitsu) is a male nesting doll with blonde hair, blue eyes and fair skin with freckles. He wears a red shirt with yellow stripes, a matching bottom part, and a dark red collar. His pants are also dark brown with silver buttons.
Wayne (voiced by Frankie Ryan Manriquez) is a male nesting doll with dark brown hair, tan skin, and green eyes. He wears glasses with black edges, a light green shirt, and matching dark green overalls. He is Twinkle's older brother. He has an obsession with toast.
Twinkle (voiced by Liliana Mumy) is a female nesting doll with dark brown hair tied in puffy pigtails and blue eyes. She wears a pink headband with pink stars and a small pink bow, a light pink shirt with glitter and a pink duck hatching from an egg in the middle, and a magenta skirt with purple stripes. She is Wayne's younger sister. She tends to think of grand ideas that are usually shot down by Fran.
Kip (voiced by Rory Thost) is a male nesting doll with blue hair, brown eyes, and fair skin. He wears a light blue T-Shirt with a blue robot on it, a dark blue zipper hoodie, and blue matching pants, which look like jeans.
Fran (voiced by Edie McClurg) is a female nesting doll who is a squirrel with red fur and is the pet of Kip. She speaks with an Upper Midwest accent.
Pizza Guy (voiced by Dee Bradley Baker) is a male nesting doll who is the local pizza delivery man, as well as a close friend of the Higgly Kids.
Ms. Fern (voiced by Jamie-Lynn Sigler) is a female nesting doll who serves as a teacher.

Cast

Main voices
Taylor Masamitsu – Eubie
Frankie Ryan Manriquez – Wayne
Liliana Mumy – Twinkle
Rory Thost – Kip
Edie McClurg – Fran 
Dee Bradley Baker – Pizza Guy
Jamie-Lynn Sigler – Ms. Fern

Supporting voices
Alanna Ubach - Plunkie, Mrs. Whiskers
Kevin Michael Richardson - Uncle Lemmo, Twinkle and Wayne’s uncle
Mindy Sterling - Eubie’s Aunt Mellie
Dee Bradley Baker - Grandpop Krank, Eubie’s grandfather, Eubie’s Uncle Zooter
Valyn Hall - Wiki & Tini (Season 1 Only) Kip’s big sisters
Lara Jill Miller - Wiki & Tini (Seasons 2 And 3) Kip’s big sisters, Pookie (Season 2 Only) Kip’s baby sister
Jim Wise - Fripp, Kip’s dad
Rachel York - Bitty, Kip’s mom
Betty White - Grandmama, Kip’s grandmother
David Jeremiah - Grandpapa, Kip’s grandfather
 Cicely Tyson – Great Aunt Shirley

Guest voices

 Donald Faison – Firefighter Hero
 Kathie Lee Gifford – Mail Carrier Hero (Post Carrier Hero in UK dub)
 Camryn Manheim – Handy Plumber Hero
 Steven Weber – Gardener Hero
 Katey Sagal – Policewoman Hero
 Frances Conroy – Veterinarian Hero
 Katrin Petersen - School Principal Hero
 Mark Therrell - Construction Worker Hero
 Jimmy Hayward - Military Career Hero
 Lance Bass – Electrician Hero
 John Michael Higgins  – Tow Truck Driver Hero
 Tim Curry – Librarian Hero, Higgsquatch
 Cyndi Lauper – Telephone Operator Hero
 Jim Wise – Sanitation Worker Hero, Tour Guide Hero
 Susan Lucci – Weathergirl Hero
 Miguel Sandoval – Painter Hero
 Travis Tritt – Farmer Hero
 Ed McMahon – Tugboat Captain Hero
 Smokey Robinson – Grocery Clerk Hero
 Ricki Lake – Carpenter Hero (Alice)
 Stuart Pankin – Bus Driver Hero, Captain Steve
 Wally Kurth – The Eye Doctor Hero
 John Astin – Santa Claus
 Sean Astin – Pix the Elf
 Sharon Stone – Nicki the Blind Art Teacher
 Anne Heche – Gloria the Waitress
 Dee Bradley Baker – Egg Farmer Hero
 Matt Cavenaugh – Tailor Hero
 Raven-Symoné – Playground Monitor Hero
 Jesse Corti – Jax, Submarine Captain Hero
 Nathalia Hencker – Translator Hero
 David Naughton – Orchestra Conductor Hero
 Rocco DiSpirito – Baker Hero
 Steve Harris – Sports Coach Hero
 Marissa Jaret Winokur – Taxi Driver Hero
 Carlos Alazraqui – Shelter Worker Hero
 Irene Bedard – Forest Ranger Hero
 Henry Dittman – Detective Hero, Gardener, Sign Language Interpreter Hero, Higglytown Coast Guard Hero
 Erik Estrada – Ambulance Driver, Paramedic Hero
 Kevin Michael Richardson – Uncle Lemmo
 Rob Paulsen – Barber Hero
 Mindy Sterling – Mrs. Barber, Musician Hero #2
 Diedrich Bader – Crane Operator Hero, Mr. Librarian
 Masasa – Judge Hero
 Trace Adkins – Cowboy Hero
 Serena Williams – Snow Plow Driver Hero
 Thomas F. Wilson – Truck Driver Hero
 Phil LaMarr – Lifeguard Hero
 Gwendoline Yeo – Dentist Hero
 Wayne Brady – Doctor Hero
 Farrah Fawcett – School Nurse Hero
 Stacey Hendrickson - Pharmacist Hero
 Kate Pierson – Beekeeper Hero
 Maggie Wheeler – Street Sweeper Hero
 Alyson Reed – Zookeeper Hero
 Debbie Allen – Dance Instructor Hero
 Gregory Jbara – Tree Trimmer Hero
 Mo Collins – Science Fair Judge, Paleontologist Hero
 Simon Templeman – Banker Hero
 Philip Anthony-Rodriguez – Furnace Repairman Hero (Boiler Repairman Hero in UK dub)
 Jentle Phoenix – Environmentalist Hero
 Rain Pryor – Dr. Ferguson the Pediatrician Hero (Paediatrician Hero in UK dub)
 Wally Wingert – Waiter Hero, Hector the Donkey Guide Hero
 Dave Wittenberg – Mr. Baker, Sled Dog Musher
 Michael T. Weiss – Mountain Rescue Squad Hero
 Matthew St. Patrick – Police Man Hero
 Jane Kaczmarek – Astronaut Hero
 Jorge Garcia – Dog Trainer Hero
 Debi Mae West – Lighthouse Keeper Hero, Physical Therapist Hero
 Nicole Parker – Window Washer Hero
 Pete Siragusa – Ice Resurfacer Hero
 Roberto Alcaraz – Air Traffic Controller Hero
 Kimberly Brooks – Photographer Hero
 Matthew Kaminsky – Drawbridge Operator Hero
 Matt Nolte - Caveman Hero
 David Jolliffe – Radiographer Hero
 Henry Winkler – Printer Hero
 Neil Kaplan – Mover Hero
 Joey Fatone – Bulldozer Operator Hero
 Jessica Walter – Motel Manager Hero
 Wilmer Valderrama – Helicopter Pilot Hero
 Leanza Cornett – Airplane Pilot Hero
 Gayla Goehl – Sheep Shearer Hero
 Frank Welker - Sheriff Hero
 Alanna Ubach – Babysitter Hero
 Jonathan Adams – Road Worker Hero
 Aisha Tyler – Museum Curator Hero
 Stephnie Weir – Animal Control Officer Hero
 Jess Harnell – Laundry Worker Hero
 Leslie Boone – Mechanic Hero, Bessy the Cow, Farmer Lulu, Dump Truck Driver Hero
 Meghan Strange – Camp Counselor Hero
 Bill Farmer – Janitor Hero Jay (Caretaker Hero Craig in UK dub)
 Billy Vera – Ferry Boat Captain Hero
 Charlie Schlatter – Receptionist Hero
 David Jeremiah- Mapmaker Hero
 Catero Colbert – Camel Rider
 Tom Kenny – Reporter Hero
 Dee Bradley Baker, Mindy Sterling, & Alanna Ubach – Musician Heroes
 Jeff Bennett – Auctioneer Hero
 Michael T. Weiss – Veterinarian Hero
 Julianne Grossman – Roofer Hero
 Jon Curry – Allergist Hero
 J. Grant Albrecht – Locksmith Hero
 J. P. Manoux – Bike Repair Hero
 Camryn Manheim – Plumber Hero
 Scott McShane – Bridge Builder Hero
 Leslie Boone – Dump Truck Driver Hero
 Jo Anne Worley – Customer Service Clerk Hero
 John O'Hurley – Freight Train Engineer Hero
 Bobby Holiday – House Painter Hero
 Kevin Michael Richardson – Uncle Lemmo the Short-Order Cook Hero
 Charlie Janasz – Photographer Hero
 Kimberly Brooks – Ski Patrol Hero
 Jeffrey Tambor – Radio Announcer
 Wes Brown – Phone Repairman Hero
 Debra Wilson Skelton – Marine Biologist Hero
 Chris Carmack – Referee Hero
 Joey Gian – Stan the Bricklayer Man Hero
 They Might Be Giants – The Supertasters
 Shawn King – Usher Hero
 Ruth Williamson - Cafeteria Lady Hero
 Anna Maria Perez de Tagle – Shelby the Safety Patroller Hero

Episodes

Series overview

Season 1 (2004–2005)

Season 2 (2005–2006)

Season 3 (2006–2008)

References

Cited works
 Victor C. Strasburger and Edward Donnerstein, 1999. "Children, Adolescents, and the Media: Issues and Solutions," Pediatrics, volume 103, number 1: pp. 129–139: Open Access Copy

External links
 
 

2000s American animated television series
2004 American television series debuts
2008 American television series endings
American children's animated adventure television series
American children's animated fantasy television series
American children's animated musical television series
American computer-animated television series
American preschool education television series
Animated television series about children
Animated television series about squirrels
Disney animated television series
Disney Channel original programming
Disney Junior original programming
English-language television shows
Television series by DHX Media
Television series by Disney
Animated preschool education television series
2000s preschool education television series